The 2000–01 Ole Miss Rebels men's basketball team represented the University of Mississippi in the 2000–01 NCAA Division I men's basketball season. The Rebels were led by thirth-year head coach, Rod Barnes. The Rebels played their home games at Tad Smith Coliseum in Oxford, Mississippi as members of the Southeastern Conference. This season marked the sixth NCAA Tournament appearance in school history.

Roster

Schedule and results

|-
!colspan=6 style=|Non-conference regular season

|-
!colspan=6 style=|SEC regular season

|-
!colspan=12 style=| SEC tournament

|-
!colspan=12 style=| NCAA tournament

Source:

References 

Ole Miss
Ole Miss Rebels men's basketball seasons
Ole Miss
Ole Miss Rebels men's basketball
Ole Miss Rebels men's basketball